The Cape Libraries Automated Materials Sharing (CLAMS) library network is a non-profit consortium of 35 member libraries and 38 locations throughout Cape Cod, Martha's Vineyard, and Nantucket. Since it was founded in 1991, the network has registered over 255,000 cardholders. It completes over 3.5 million transactions per year. The number of items available has grown from 568,000 in 1991 to over 1.6 million in 2014. Deliveries of materials between member libraries and other library networks in Massachusetts through an interlibrary loan program are made by the Massachusetts Library System located in Waltham
. The network uses Sierra integrated library system (ILS) for staff function workflows: acquisitions, cataloging, circulation, ILL, and serials as well as for their patron's Online Public Access Catalog (OPAC). The libraries provide access to reference databases, digital libraries, access to free music online, museum passes, genealogy, workshops, and other free services that vary from each location.

Digital Services

CLAMS has a page dedicated to free digital media that the libraries offer as well as additional free sources found on the web that include: Project Gutenberg's E-book and audiobook pages, Google Books, the Internet Archive, the Perseus Project, among other resources. This page also offers tutorials for patrons to learn how to browse, check-out, read, and return E-books and audiobooks from different e-book devices.

OverDrive

Cape Libraries Automated Materials Sharing began a partnership with OverDrive in Spring 2008 to offer patrons 24 hours a day, 7 days a week access to a public digital library where they could check-out ebook, audiobook, music and/or video titles through the CLAMS OverDrive website. OverDrive is a distributor of ebooks, audiobooks, music, and videos. All of the public libraries participate in the OverDrive lending program. Cape Cod Community College is the only member of the CLAMS network that does not participate. However, students from the college are encouraged to obtain a CLAMS card from the library in the town that they live in. All towns on Cape Cod have at least one library that is a member of the Cape Libraries Automated Materials Sharing network except for the town of Sandwich.

Freegal Music

According to the CLAMS OPAC, since 2010, "Freegal is a music download web site available by subscription. Music titles are from the Sony Music Entertainment catalog in MP3 formats." Not all libraries have subscriptions to Freegal. Only cardholders from participating libraries have access to this service.

TumbleBooks

TumbleBooks are interactive ebooks for children that are also only available to those cardholders whose libraries subscribe to the service. The CLAMS record summarizes TumbleBooks as, "animated storybooks which can be played with sound on a computer or read aloud by a child with the sound off. TumbleBooks also offer a variety of games and audiobooks."

LEA (State eBook Project)

The CLAMS library network is a participant in the state's LEA program. Library eBooks and Audiobooks (LEA) is a lending program that allows the patrons of one network to check out ebooks and audiobooks from the collection of another network. "This service is made possible by the CLAMS member libraries and the Massachusetts Board of Library Commissioners with funding from the Institute of Museum and Library Services and the Commonwealth of Massachusetts."

Member Libraries 
Public Libraries:
Aquinnah Public Library
Sturgis Library, Barnstable
Jonathan Bourne Public Library
Brewster Ladies' Library
Centerville Public Library
Eldredge Public Library, Chatham
Chilmark Free Public Library
Cotuit Library (Barnstable)
Jacob Sears Memorial Library, East Dennis
Dennis Memorial Library, Dennis
Dennis Public Library, Dennis Port
South Dennis Free Public Library
West Dennis Library
Eastham Public Library
Edgartown Public Library
Falmouth Public Library
East Falmouth Library
North Falmouth Library
West Falmouth Library
Brooks Free Library, Harwich
Hyannis Public Library (Barnstable)
Marstons Mills Public Library (Barnstable)
Mashpee Public Library
Nantucket Atheneum Library
Oak Bluffs Public Library
Snow Library, Orleans
Osterville Village Library (Barnstable)
Provincetown Public Library
Truro Public Library
Vineyard Haven Public Library, Tisbury
Wellfleet Public Library
Whelden Memorial Library, West Barnstable
West Tisbury Free Public Library
Woods Hole Public Library (Falmouth)
South Yarmouth Library
West Yarmouth Library
Yarmouth Port Library

Academic Library:
Cape Cod Community College, Wilkens Library

See also
C/W MARS (Central/Western Massachusetts Automated Resource Sharing)
Merrimack Valley Library Consortium (MVLC)
Minuteman Library Network (MLN)
North of Boston Library Exchange (NOBLE)
Old Colony Library Network (OCLN)
SAILS Library Network

References

External links
 info.clamsnet.org
 library.clamsnet.org

Cape Cod and the Islands
Library consortia in Massachusetts
1991 establishments in Massachusetts